Paul Brian Rosario (born 17 April 1982, in Manila) is a Filipino sport shooter. At the 2012 Summer Olympics he competed in the Men's skeet, finishing in 31st place.

References

Filipino male sport shooters
1982 births
Living people
Sportspeople from Manila
Olympic shooters of the Philippines
Shooters at the 2012 Summer Olympics
Shooters at the 2006 Asian Games
Southeast Asian Games gold medalists for the Philippines
Southeast Asian Games silver medalists for the Philippines
Southeast Asian Games medalists in shooting
Competitors at the 2005 Southeast Asian Games
Asian Games competitors for the Philippines
21st-century Filipino people